Famous Cryp is the debut mixtape by American rapper Blueface. It was released on June 20, 2018 by Fifth Amendment Entertainment and Entertainment One. The mixtape features a guest appearance by fellow West Coast rapper Joey Franko. The mixtape was re-released as a reloaded edition on July 24, 2020. It features additional guest appearances from Trucarr, Snoop Dogg, Cardi B, Asian Doll, 9lokkNine, NLE Choppa, YG, Ron Suno, Coyote, Sada Baby, Kiddo Curry, Flash Gottii, 03 Greedo, DJ Kay Slay, A Boogie wit da Hoodie, and Moneybagg Yo. It contains production from Laudiano, Scum Beatz, and LowTheGreat, among a variety of other record producers.

The mixtape's lead single, "Thotiana", peaked at number 8 on the Billboard Hot 100 chart and has an official remix featuring Cardi B and YG on the reloaded edition, with two separate remixes with each artist individually featured.

Critical reception

Fred Thomas of AllMusic described the album as offering "a brief snapshot of his style, characterized by a flow that seems entirely unconcerned with following the beat", adding that Blueface's vocal style "gasps, sputters, and stumbles as it rolls out weird but charismatic one-liners and hooks."

Track listing

Charts

Weekly charts

Year-end charts

References

2018 mixtape albums
Blueface albums
Debut mixtape albums